Francis Robert Chapman (31 January 1831 – 18 March 1924), known as Frank, was an Anglican priest, Archdeacon of Sudbury from 1869  until 1900.

Chapman was educated at Exeter College, Oxford and ordained in 1855. He served curacies at Leeds then Kensington. He was Perpetual Curate at Walsham-le-Willows from 1860 to 1865 and the Vicar of St James's, Bury St Edmunds from  1865 to 1873; and Rector of Stowlangtoft from 1873 to 1881.

Chapman edited two volumes The Sacrist Rolls of Ely (1907–8).

References

1831 births
1924 deaths
19th-century English Anglican priests
20th-century English Anglican priests
Alumni of Exeter College, Oxford
Archdeacons of Sudbury